John Archibald  (1 May 1840 – 10 September 1915) was a Scottish Anglican priest and author. 

He was born in Inveresk near Musselburgh, educated at Trinity College, Glenalmond and Aberdeen University  and ordained  in  1870. He was Curate of St John's Church, Darwen then the incumbent at St John's Church, Wick. In 1876, he became Rector of Trinity Episcopal Church, Keith, and later a Canon of Inverness Cathedral. He was appointed Dean of Moray, Ross, and Caithness in May 1902.

He retired in 1912 and died in Birmingham, England, aged 75.

References

1840 births
1915 deaths
People from Musselburgh
People educated at Glenalmond College
Alumni of the University of Aberdeen
Scottish Episcopalian clergy
Deans of Moray, Ross and Caithness